My General's Women (Spanish: Las mujeres de mi general) is a 1951 Mexican drama film directed by Ismael Rodríguez and starring Pedro Infante, Lilia Prado and Chula Prieto.

The film's sets were designed by the art director José Rodríguez Granada.

Cast
 Pedro Infante as General Juan Zepeda 
 Lilia Prado as Lupe 
 Chula Prieto as Carlota 
 Miguel Manzano as Coronel Domingo Vargas 
 Miguel Inclán as Blas  
 Arturo Soto Rangel as Don Jelipe  
 Lupe Inclán as Tacha  
 Alberto Catalá as Marco Polo  
 Miguel Ángel López as Romulito  
 Pedro de Urdimalas as Salas 
 Ángel Infante as Sarmiento, el traidor  
 Jorge Mondragon as Fermín Mendoza 
 Luis Aragón as Soldado  
 Daniel Arroyo as Invitado al baile  
 Guillermo Bravo Sosa as Invitado al baile  
 José Chávez as Sargento  
 Roberto Corell as Alcalde  
 Guillermo Cramer as Invitado al baile  
 Pedro Elviro as Invitado al baile  
 Rogelio Fernández as Soldado  
 Jesús Garcia as Notario  
 Leonor Gómez as Pueblerina  
 Cecilia Leger as Invitada al baile 
 Elvira Lodi
 Chel López
 Concepción Martínez as Invitada al baile  
 Héctor Mateos as Hacendado, invitado al baile  
 José Muñoz as Soldado  
 Francisco Pando as Invitado al baile  
 Salvador Quiroz as Militar  
 Joaquín Roche as Militar 
 María Luisa Smith as Invitada al baile  
 María Valdealde as Invitada al baile gruñóna  
 Domingo Vargas

References

Bibliography 
 Juanita Heredia. Transnational Latina Narratives in the Twenty-first Century. Palgrave Macmillan, 2009.

External links 
 

1951 films
1951 drama films
Mexican drama films
1950s Spanish-language films
Films directed by Ismael Rodríguez
Mexican black-and-white films
1950s Mexican films